Kolana is a genus of Neotropical butterflies in the family Lycaenidae.

Species
Kolana buccina (Druce, 1907)
Kolana chlamys (Druce, 1907)
Kolana ergina (Hewitson, 1867)
Kolana ligurina (Hewitson, 1874)
Kolana lyde (Godman & Salvin, [1887])

References

Eumaeini
Lycaenidae of South America
Lycaenidae genera